The Miss Georgia's Teen competition is the pageant that selects the representative for the U.S. state of Georgia in the Miss America's Teen pageant. The pageant is held each June in Columbus, Georgia.

Rebecca Zhang of Johns Creek was crowned Miss Georgia's Outstanding Teen on June 18, 2022, at the RiverCenter of the Performing Arts in Columbus, Georgia. She competed for the title of Miss America's Outstanding Teen 2023 at the Hyatt Regency Dallas in Dallas, Texas on August 12, 2022, where she was in the Top 11.

On December 29, 2022, Zhang resigned her title due to her academic obligations at Vanderbilt University. The Miss Georgia Organization announced that Anna Kate Robinson, the 2nd runner-up to Zhang, will assume the title of Miss Georgia's Outstanding Teen 2022.

In January of 2023, the official name of the pageant was changed from Miss Georgia’s Outstanding Teen, to Miss Georgia’s Teen, in accordance with the national pageant.

Results summary
The results of Miss Georgia's Outstanding Teen as they participated in the national Miss America's Outstanding Teen competition. The year in parentheses indicates the year of the Miss America's Outstanding Teen competition the award/placement was garnered.

Placements
 Miss America's Outstanding Teen: Olivia McMillan (2015)
 1st runners-up: Annie Swan (2018)
 2nd runners-up: Camille Sims (2011), Kelsey Hollis (2017)
 3rd runners-up: Jameson Kenerly (2013), Megan Wright (2022)
 4th runners-up: Rory Pan (2019)
 Top 10: Julia Martin (2012), Victoria Smith (2016)
 Top 11: Rebecca Zhang (2023)

Awards

Preliminary awards
 Preliminary Evening Wear/On Stage Question: Annie Swan (2018) (tie), Rory Pan (2019) (tie), Megan Wright (2022)
 Preliminary Talent: Jameson Kenerly (2013), Olivia McMillan (2015), Kelsey Hollis (2017)

Non-finalist awards
 Non-finalist Evening Wear/On Stage Question: Lauren Edmunds (2007)

Other awards
 Advertising Award: Jameson Kenerly (2013)
 Outstanding Achievement in Academic Life: Jameson Kenerly (2013)
 Outstanding Dance Award: Annie Swan (2018)
 Outstanding Vocalist Award: Olivia McMillan (2015), Kelsey Hollis (2017)
 Overall Dance Award: Rory Pan (2019)

Winners

References

External links
 Official website

Georgia
Georgia (U.S. state) culture
Women in Georgia (U.S. state)
Annual events in Georgia (U.S. state)